Morehead City Municipal Building is a historic municipal building located at Morehead City, Carteret County, North Carolina. It was built in 1926, and is a two-story, stuccoed brick building in the Florentine Renaissance style.  It has a low hipped roof and an in-antis porch, with two stone, full height, engaged Ionic order columns.  Also on the property are the contributing Fulford and Day Monument (1920), American Legion Monument (c. 1945), and Flagpole and Armistice Marker (c. 1945).

It was listed on the National Register of Historic Places in 2004.

References

Government buildings on the National Register of Historic Places in North Carolina
Renaissance Revival architecture in North Carolina
Government buildings completed in 1926
Buildings and structures in Carteret County, North Carolina
National Register of Historic Places in Carteret County, North Carolina